The Walvis Bay Reformed Church is a congregation of the Reformed Churches in South Africa (GKSA) in the town of Walvis Bay, Namibia, but also includes nearby Swakopmund. The Henties Bay Reformed Church broke away in 2006, but the Walvis Bay pastor continues to handle it concurrently. Walvis Bay's membership was 267 in 2015, more or less evenly split between Walvis Bay and Swakopmund. Services are held in both towns every Sunday.

Walvis Bay started as a district of the Usakos Reformed Church, founded in 1953 as a likely offshoot of the Windhoek Reformed Church. Until 1955, services in Walvis Bay were held in the Freemasons' lodge and later in the courthouse, members' houses, and the Emma Hoogenhout Primary School meeting hall. The district acquired two plots of land from the city government for £1. A construction fund was founded with money from the Usakos church council. On October 27, 1956, the area of Walvis Bay, Swakopmund, and Henties Bay was given its own congregation, draining so many members from the Usakos congregation that the latter dissolved four years after.

In 1960, the young congregation hired Jac H. van Zanten as architect and J. Eisenberg as contractor. In 1961, a third of the church building was completed, including the pews and communion altar, and 40 chairs had been purchased. After fundraising and a contribution from a Rev. Bos from the Netherlands, the building was finished according to the original plan in 1970. The Rev. Bos also contributed the pulpit.

On November 8, 2009, the around 100 GKSA worshipers in Swakopmund began to use their own church building. The Sola Gratia church is built atop a flat wing of the local Dutch Reformed Church in South Africa (NGK), which had to use the same building at the time.

The Rev. Schutte's tenure 
The Rev. Hendrik Willem (Hennie) Schutte was invested in his first congregation, the Walvis Bay Reformed Church, on January 15, 1995, shortly after his graduation in 1994. Shortly before moving to Namibia, he married his childhood sweetheart, Sandra Koorsen of Bloemfontein. The services were rather unique in that each Sunday morning, 2 services were held, one in Walvis Bay at 9:00 AM and one in Swakopmund at 11:00 AM. After his Walvis Bay service, he needed to travel 40 km to Swakopmund on the busy B1 road. This road was nicknamed the "road of death" due to a high accident rate.

On Sunday, May 21, 1995, a fine service in Walvis Bay was followed by the usual coffee klatch of the worshipers with the Schuttes before they left for Swakopmund. It was only 2 weeks after the congregation camp, and everyone was still abuzz over how well the new pastor and his wife had fit in to their new post. That day around 10:25 AM, and barely 3 km out of Walvis Bay in an area known as "the long turn," a vehicle hit their car where Sandra was sitting. Both the other car's occupants died instantly, but so did Sandra. The Rev. Schutte was admitted to the local hospital in critical condition and transferred to intensive care in Bloemfontein, where both his parents and in-laws waited in a month-long vigil for his recovery. Sandra was laid to rest on May 29, 1995 in the cemetery of her parents' congregation, the Berg en Dal Church of the Bloemheuwel Reformed Church (NGK), by its Rev. Hubrecht van Dalsen.

Nadat hy in so ‘n mate herstel het dat hy sy bedieningswerk kon voortsit, keer ds. Hennie laat in 1995 terug na Walvisbaai en bedien die gemeente met baie seën en toewyding tot in 2001, toe hy ‘n beroep na GK Pretoria-Wes aanvaar.

After his full recovery, the Rev. Schutte returned to continue officiating for the congregation until 2001, when he left for a post at the Pretoria-East Reformed Church, followed in 2007 by a stint between the De Aar, Strydenburg, and Oranjerivier Reformed Churches, where he worked until 2010. From 2010 to 2012, he worked at the Noord-Oosrand Reformed Church, and since 2012 he has served the Wesrand Reformed Church.

Pastors 
 Van der Walt, Marthinus Wessel, 1955–1958 (together with Grootfontein, Usakos, and Otjiwarongo)
 Van Dalsen, dr. Hubrecht Anthonie, 1961–1964 (together with Outjo and Outjo-Wes)
 Heystek, Andries Stefanus, 1969–1974
 Kruger, Tjaart Jan Jacobus, 1975–1982
 De Villiers, Izak Jacobus Johannes, 1983 – 1986
 Lartz, dr. Deon, 1986–1994
 Schutte, Hendrik Willem, 1995–2001
 Vogel, Landman Van der Merwe, 2002–2006; 2006 – 22 Julie 2013 (together with Henties Bay; died in office)
 Robinson, Cobus-Brahm, 2014 – 2017 (intogether with Henties Bay)
 Zwemstra, dr. H.M. (Heinrich), Sunday, December 3, 2017 – present (together with Henties Bay)

Sources 
 (af) Harris, C.T., Noëth, J.G., Sarkady, N.G., Schutte, F.M. en Van Tonder, J.M. 2010. Van seringboom tot kerkgebou: die argitektoniese erfenis van die Gereformeerde Kerke. Potchefstroom: Administratiewe Buro.
 (af) Schalekamp, Rev. M.E. (chairman: edition commission). 2001. Die Almanak van die Gereformeerde Kerke in Suid-Afrika vir die jaar 2002. Potchefstroom: Administratiewe Buro.
 (af) Van der Walt, Dr. S.J. (chairman: almanac deputies). 1997. Die Almanak van die Gereformeerde Kerke in Suid-Afrika vir die jaar 1998. Potchefstroom: Administratiewe Buro.
 (af) Venter, Rev. A.A. (chief ed.) 1957. Almanak van die Gereformeerde Kerk in Suid-Afrika vir die jaar 1958. Potchefstroom: Administratiewe Buro.
 (af) Venter, Rev. A.A. (chief ed.) 1958. Almanak van die Gereformeerde Kerk in Suid-Afrika vir die jaar 1959. Potchefstroom: Administratiewe Buro.
 (af) Vogel, Willem (ed.). 2014. Die Almanak van die Gereformeerde Kerke in Suid-Afrika vir die jaar 2015. Potchefstroom: Administratiewe Buro.

Churches in Namibia
20th-century Calvinist and Reformed churches
Reformed Churches in South Africa